Graham H. Godfrey (born August 9, 1984) is a former professional baseball player. He played for the Oakland Athletics in Major League Baseball.

Career

Amateur
Godfrey attended Memorial High School in Houston, Texas and the College of Charleston. In 2006, he played collegiate summer baseball with the Cotuit Kettleers of the Cape Cod Baseball League.

Toronto Blue Jays
Godfrey was drafted by the Toronto Blue Jays in the 34th round of the 2006 Major League Baseball Draft. He played for the Class-A Lansing Lugnuts in 2007.

Oakland Athletics
Following the 2007 season, Godfrey was traded to the Oakland Athletics with Kristian Bell for Marco Scutaro.

Godfrey was promoted to the major leagues to make his major league debut on June 10, 2011 against the Chicago White Sox.

In his debut, Godfrey pitched 4.1 innings giving up nine hits and five runs, walking two and striking out two, earning the no-decision in the eventual 7-5 win. Godfrey's first major league strikeout was of Gordon Beckham. The game was also interim manager Bob Melvin's first win with the Oakland Athletics

Godfrey fared much better in his second major league start on June 17.  Facing the defending World Series champion San Francisco Giants in front of a sold out crowd in Oakland, Godfrey picked up his first Major League win, going 7 innings, allowing six hits and two runs (one earned) while striking out three and walking none.

Boston Red Sox
On December 7, 2012, Godfrey was traded to the Red Sox as the player to be named later in a previous deal.

Pittsburgh Pirates
On May 31, 2013, Godfrey was once again traded, this time to the Pittsburgh Pirates.

Arizona Diamondbacks
On August 3, 2014, Godfrey signed a minor league contract with the Arizona Diamondbacks. On November 4, 2014 he was granted free agency.

References

External links

1984 births
Living people
Lansing Lugnuts players
Stockton Ports players
Midland RockHounds players
Sacramento River Cats players
Oakland Athletics players
College of Charleston Cougars baseball players
Cotuit Kettleers players
Pawtucket Red Sox players
Baseball players from Tampa, Florida
Major League Baseball pitchers
Indianapolis Indians players
Arizona League Diamondbacks players
Mobile BayBears players
Memorial High School (Hedwig Village, Texas) alumni